Dunckerocampus naia (Naia pipefish) is thought to be a species of marine fish of the family Syngnathidae, although further taxonomic study is needed to determine if the classification is valid or if this species is synonymous with D. dactyliophorus. It is found in the Pacific Ocean, off of Japan, Guam, Indonesia, Fiji, and the Solomon Islands. It is expected to feed on small crustaceans. This species is ovoviviparous, with males carrying eggs and giving birth to live young.

Identifying Features

D. naia can be identified by its colour pattern of 24–31 alternating pale yellow and maroon bars. Its tail fin in mostly red, with broad white upper and lower margins.

References

Further reading

Encyclopedia of Life

naia
Marine fish
Fish described in 2004